Simphiwe Martin Sithole (born 3 February 1984 in Pietermaritzburg) is a South African rugby union player for the  in the Currie Cup and the Rugby Challenge. His regular position is flanker.

Career

Youth
He played in the youth Currie Cup tournaments at Under-19 level in 2002 and Under-20 level in 2003.

Pumas
In wasn't until 2008 following a return to the  that he made his first class provincial debut.

He quickly became a regular in the first team, making 37 appearances in both the Vodacom Cup and Currie Cup competitions between 2008 and 2011.

Griffons

He was a key member of their 2014 Currie Cup First Division-winning side. He played off the bench in the final and helped the Griffons win the match 23–21 to win their first trophy for six years.

Representative rugby
In 2002, he played for a South African Schools side against France and Wales. Three years later, he represented the South African Under-21s at the 2005 Under 21 Rugby World Championship, playing in one game.

He was also selected for the South African Barbarians (North) team against  that toured South Africa as part of the 2012 mid-year rugby test series.

References

1984 births
Living people
Griffons (rugby union) players
Pumas (Currie Cup) players
Rugby union players from Pietermaritzburg
South African rugby union players
Rugby union flankers